Live is a double live album released by British-American rock band Fleetwood Mac on 8 December 1980. It was the first live album from the then-current line-up of the band, and the next would be The Dance from 1997. The album was certified gold (500,000 copies sold) by the RIAA in November 1981.

Live consists of recordings taken primarily from the 1979–1980 Tusk Tour, together with a few from the earlier Rumours Tour of 1977 and a Buckingham Nicks track, "Don't Let Me Down Again", from the 1975 Fleetwood Mac Tour. According to the liner notes, two songs were recorded at a Paris soundcheck and three at a performance at Santa Monica Civic Auditorium "for an audience of friends and road crew".

Of particular note are three new songs—Christine McVie's "One More Night", Stevie Nicks's "Fireflies", and a well-harmonized backstage rendition of the Beach Boys' "The Farmer's Daughter". The latter two were released as singles; "Fireflies" reached the top 60 in the US, while "The Farmer's Daughter" reached the top 10 in Austria. "Fireflies" was Nicks' rumination on the tumultuous recording of the Tusk album and her observance that the band stayed intact nevertheless. Her lyrics referred to band members as the "five fireflies". "The Farmer's Daughter" appears to have actually been recorded at The Village Recorders studio where Tusk was recorded despite the liner notes—it appears in the Tusk re-release of 2004 nearly identical sans crowd noise. It would appear that "Fireflies" is also actually a studio demo from the same time. Various very similar takes from a recording session have emerged on bootlegs, and at least two separate vocal tracks featuring Nicks can be heard on the version released on Live. "Don't Let Me Down Again" is a song from the Buckingham Nicks album and was actually recorded earlier than the rest of the tracks; the recording was made in 1975 in Passaic. The band covered "Farmer's Daughter" at the request of Buckingham, who deemed the Brian Wilson tune obscure enough to include on the album.

Also notable are two Lindsey Buckingham guitar showcases. The first, "I'm So Afraid", was popular as a concert finale during this period. The second was Buckingham's take on former Mac guitarist Peter Green's signature number, "Oh Well" (originally a 1969 single release).

A deluxe edition of the album was released on 9 April 2021.

Track listing

Personnel
Fleetwood Mac
Lindsey Buckingham – guitar, vocals
Stevie Nicks – vocals
Christine McVie – keyboards, vocals
John McVie – bass
Mick Fleetwood – drums, percussion

Additional personnel
Ray Lindsey – additional guitar on "Go Your Own Way"
Tony Toadaro – additional percussion
Jeffery Sova – additional keyboards

Production
Richard Dashut – producer, mix-down engineer, live engineering
Ken Caillat – producer, live recording, mix-down engineer
Fleetwood Mac – producers
Biff Dawes – live recording
Trip Khalaf – live engineering
Carla Frederick – studio recording assistant
Rich Feldman – studio recording assistant
David (Dominguez) Ahlert – studio recording assistant
Ken Perry – mastering
Larry Vigon – art direction and design
Chris Callis – cover and collage photography
Sam Emerson – collage photography
Sharon Weisz – collage photography

Charts

Album

Singles

Certifications

References

Albums produced by Richard Dashut
Albums produced by Ken Caillat
Fleetwood Mac live albums
1980 live albums
Warner Records live albums
Albums recorded at the Santa Monica Civic Auditorium
Albums produced by John McVie
Albums produced by Mick Fleetwood
Albums produced by Christine McVie
Albums produced by Lindsey Buckingham